Felipe Estanislao Mac Gregor Rolino (*Callao, Peru, September 20, 1914 – October 2, 2004) was a Jesuit and Professor in Peru.  He introduced the concept of the  Culture of Peace to UNESCO, which became a major program of the organization.

Biography
Felipe Mac Gregor was born in Callao on September 20, 1914.
He entered the Society of Jesus on 1931 in Cordoba, Argentina. He was ordained as a priest on December 23, 1944.
Former Rector of Pontificia Universidad Católica del Perú.

Works
Graficos de historia de la filosofía, coautor con Ismael Quiles, Espasa-Calpe, Bs.AS,1952.
Decreto ley N°17437 sobre régimen de la Universidad Peruana, UNMSM, Lima,1969.
La investigación de la paz, En Socialismo y participaciónN°22(Junio 1983).
Siete ensayos sobre la violencia en el Perú, Fundación Friedrich Ebert,1985(74 pgs.).
Cultura de Paz, Lima,1986.
La raiz del problema, Apep, Lima,1993.(52 pgs.)
Perú, Siglo XXI, PUCP, Lima,1996(117 pgs.).
Sociedad, ley y universidad peruana, PUCP, Lima,1998(220 pgs.).
Reflexión sobre el Perú, PUCP, Lima,2002(172 pgs.).
America Latina y la Doctrina de la Iglesia, diálogo latinoamericano,2004.

See also 
 Pontificia Universidad Católica del Perú PUCP

References

Felipe MacGregor: vida y legado de un maestro , por Jorge Capella Riera, en Educación.Vol 14, N°27,2005.

External links
 Felipe Mac Gregor (Rector PUCP)

1914 births
2004 deaths
People from Callao
20th-century Peruvian Jesuits
Academic staff of the Pontifical Catholic University of Peru